Michelle M. Marciniak (born October 29, 1973) is a former All-American collegiate and professional basketball player who played point guard in the Women's National Basketball Association (WNBA). As a floor general, Marciniak competed for two national championships during her three-year career at the University of Tennessee. She led the Tennessee Lady Vols to their 4th National Championship and was named MVP in the 1996 Final Four held in Charlotte, North Carolina. 

She later was the recruiting coordinator/assistant coach of the women's basketball team at the University of South Carolina from 2003-2008. Marciniak was responsible for two back to back top recruiting classes, rated #18 in 2007 and #7 in 2008, the highest ranked class ever recruited at South Carolina.

Marciniak is currently the co-founder and co-chief executive officer of Sheex in Marlton, New Jersey, a performance fabric bedding company.

Early years

High school
Marciniak was named National Player of the Year by Parade magazine, Naismith National Player of the Year, and Gatorade National High School Player of the Year as a senior in 1991 at Allentown Central Catholic High School in Allentown, Pennsylvania. She competed in the highly respected East Penn Conference, where she scored 3,025 points for Central Catholic.  Her number 23 jersey has been retired by the school in recognition of her extraordinary high school basketball achievements. In 1991, Sports Illustrated wrote about Marciniak when she was a high school junior in an article titled "She's the Ponytailed Princess of Hoop."

College
After a year at the University of Notre Dame, Marciniak transferred to the University of Tennessee, where she quickly became a leader of the dominant University of Tennessee Lady Vols women's basketball team under head coach Pat Summitt. Summitt had recruited her in high school and went into labor as she was sitting in the Marciniaks' home on a recruiting trip. Summitt quickly wrapped up the visit and flew back to Knoxville to give birth to her son, Tyler. "Spinderella" as Marciniak was affectionately known because of her free wheeling, spinning and slashing style, became a crowd favorite at Tennessee. She scored over 1,000 points and remains ranked among Tennessee's top ten all-time in assists and three-point scoring, despite only playing three seasons.

With Marciniak at point guard, the Lady Vols won consecutive Southeastern Conference championships in 1995 and 1996. In the NCAA Women's Division I Basketball Championship, Tennessee came in second to the Connecticut Huskies in 1995. The next season, Tennessee wasn't expected to be as strong, but lost just four games during the regular season and eventually returned to the Final Four, where the Lady Vols earned a rematch with UConn. Marciniak led the team to an 88-83 overtime victory, then avenged an earlier loss to Georgia to claim Tennessee's fourth national championship. During the season, Marciniak became the focused leader and played a methodical style of basketball that Pat Summitt demanded from her point guards. Marciniak was chosen the NCAA basketball tournament Most Outstanding Player for her inspired play. She graduated in 1996 with a degree in psychology.

USA Basketball
Marciniak was named to the USA U18 team (then called the Junior World Championship Qualifying Team) in 1992. The team competed in Guanajuato, Mexico in August 1992. The team won their first four games, then lost 80–70 to Brazil, finishing with the silver medal for the event, but qualifying for the 1993 world games. Marciniak averaged 6.8 points per game during the event.

Marciniak continued with the team to the 1993 U19 World Championship (then called the Junior World Championship). The team won five games and lost two, but that left them in seventh place. Marciniak averaged 3.3 points per game.

Marciniak represented the US at the 1995 World University Games held in Fukuoka, Japan in August and September 1995. The team had a record of 5–1, securing the silver medal. The USA team won early and reached a record of 5–0 when the USA beat Yugoslavia. In the semi-final game, the USA faced Russia. The team was behind much of the first half but managed to tie the game at the half. The USA broke the game open in the second half and won 101–74. The gold medal match was against unbeaten Italy. The Italian team started strong, scoring 12 of the first 14 points of the contest. Sylvia Crawley scored eight consecutive points to end the first half, but that left the USA nine points behind. The USA took a small lead in the second half, but the team from Italy responded with a ten-point run, and won the game and the gold medal by a score of 73–65. Marciniak averaged 2.9 points per game.

Marciniak was invited to be a member of the Jones Cup team representing the US in 1996. She helped the team to a 9–0 record, and the gold medal in the event. Marciniak averaged 7.4 points per games, had 24 assists, second highest on the team, and recorded 21 steals, highest on the team.

Marciniak participated on the USA team as part of the 1999 Pan American Games in Winnipeg, Manitoba, Canada. The team went 4–3 and earned a bronze medal.

WNBA
Marciniak began her professional career in the women's American Basketball League, playing all two and half seasons of that league's existence.  She played for the ABL's Portland Power, Philadelphia Rage, and Nashville Noise.  After her first season as a professional, Marciniak was a first team All Star in a league loaded with talent.  Marciniak was signed by the WNBA's expansion Portland Fire in 2000 where she was an integral part of Portland's success.  She then signed with the Seattle Storm eight days later.  Michelle found her home in Seattle the next three seasons while playing for the Storm.  She was a fan favorite, and received the WNBA Community Service Award due to the countless hours she put in to bring fans into KeyArena.

More significant was her extremely hard-nosed play on the court, as a nationally televised tussle with Los Angeles Sparks player Latasha Byears earned Marciniak a reputation as the Storm player that opponents least wished to foul. Byears intentionally threw a ball at Marciniak's face, and Marciniak, in response, charged the much larger and stronger Byears.

Marciniak retired at 29 years old, after the Storm's 2002 season, to become an assistant coach for the University of South Carolina Gamecocks in the powerhouse SEC Conference, where she had played as a collegian. Marciniak served as an assistant on the staff of head coach Susan Walvius from 2003-2008. She is also an occasional color analyst for WNBA and National Collegiate Athletic Association (NCAA) basketball games on ESPN Radio and other media outlets.

Launching SHEEX
In 2007, Marciniak and Walvius founded SHEEX, Inc., a company that is said to offer "the world's first athletic-performance sheets". Constructed from materials commonly found in modern athletic wear, SHEEX provide similar moisture-wicking, temperature-control, breathability and stretch not found in traditional cotton sheeting.

References

External links

Michelle Marciniak at WNBA.com
SHEEX.com official website

1973 births
Living people
Allentown Central Catholic High School alumni
American women's basketball coaches
American women's basketball players
Basketball players at the 1999 Pan American Games
Basketball players from Pennsylvania
Henry Crown Fellows
LGBT basketball players
LGBT people from Maryland
Lesbian sportswomen
Nashville Noise players
Notre Dame Fighting Irish women's basketball players
Pan American Games bronze medalists for the United States
Pan American Games medalists in basketball
Parade High School All-Americans (girls' basketball)
Philadelphia Rage players
Point guards
Portland Fire players
Portland Power players
Seattle Storm players
South Carolina Gamecocks women's basketball coaches
Sportspeople from Lehigh County, Pennsylvania
Tennessee Lady Volunteers basketball players
Universiade medalists in basketball
Universiade gold medalists for the United States
Medalists at the 1999 Pan American Games
United States women's national basketball team players